Below is a list of towns and cities in Norway. The Norwegian word for town or city is by. Cities were formerly categorized as kjøpstad (market town) or ladested (small seaport), each with special rights. The special trading rights for cities were abolished in 1857, and the classification was entirely rescinded in 1952 and replaced by the simple classification by.

Overview
From 1 January 1965 the focus was moved from the individual cities to their corresponding municipalities. Norwegian municipalities were classified as bykommune (urban municipality) or herredskommune (rural municipality). The distinction was rescinded by The Local Government Act of 1992. The municipalities were ordered by so-called municipality numbers, four-digit codes based on ISO 3166-2:NO which in 1946 were assigned to each municipality. Urban municipalities got a municipality number in which the third digit was a zero.

Between 1960 and 1965 many Norwegian municipalities were merged. For instance when the urban municipality Brevik merged with the urban municipality Porsgrunn and the rural municipality Eidanger, the new municipality was called Porsgrunn and retained its municipality number. As a result, Brevik was no longer considered an urban municipality/town. On another note, when the urban municipality Hønefoss was merged with the rural municipalities Hole, Norderhov, Tyristrand and Ådal to form the new municipality Ringerike, Ringerike retained the old municipality number of Hønefoss. The same thing happened to Egersund and Florø.

Before 1996, the city status was awarded by the Ministry of Local Government and Regional Development. Now the issue is decided by each municipality council and is formally accepted by the state. Since 1997 a municipality must have a minimum of 5,000 inhabitants in order to declare city status for one of its settlements. In 1999 the municipality council of Bardu declared city status for Setermoen, only to be rejected because the municipality fell short of the population limit. One exception is Honningsvåg in Nordkapp, where the municipality actually has less than 5,000 inhabitants but declared city status before the limit was implemented by law in 1997.

Because of the new laws, Norway witnessed a rapid rise in the number of cities after 1996. A number of relatively small settlements are now called by, such as Brekstad with 1,828 inhabitants and Kolvereid with 1,448 inhabitants. Among the cities of today which got this status before 1996, Tvedestrand with 1,983 inhabitants is the smallest. On another note, the laws of 1996 allowed some settlements which lost their city status in the 1960s to regain it.

Oslo, founded in 1000, is the largest city and the capital of Norway.

Cities and towns in Norway
Note that in most cases the population listed here is that of the municipality, including other villages, not just the urban centre.

In 2017 the government decided to abolish some of the counties and to merge them with other counties to form larger ones, reducing the number of counties from 19 to 11, to be implemented from 2020.

City or town status since before 1996

City status since after 1996

Former towns

See also
 List of cities in Europe
 List of urban areas in Norway by population
 Lists of villages in Norway

Notes

References

External links 

 Map with Norwegian cities
 City Population: Norway (statistics & map) –  Municipalities & Urban Settlements

 
Norway, List of cities in
Norway
Cities